Lucifer Rising is the second album by the Swedish death metal band Kaamos. It was recorded at Berno Studios and released in 2005.

Track listing 

2005 CD edition
Same track listing and order as the vinyl release issued on one disc (Catalogue: Candlelight Records Candle091CD).

Personnel 

 Kaamos
 Karl Envall - vocals, bass guitar
 Nicklas Eriksson - guitar
 Konstantin Papavassilou - guitar
 Cristofer Barkensjö (Chris Piss) - drums

References

External links 
 Encyclopaedia Metallum entry

Kaamos (Swedish band) albums
2005 albums